is a multi-use stadium in the city of Morioka, Iwate, Japan. 

The stadium was completed in June 1966 to be a venue for track and field events of the 25th National Sports Festival of Japan held in 1970. It was subsequently used for a number of football and rugby matches until the early 1990s; however, it is no longer used for official J.League games as it does not meet the current specifications.

After 1999, the stadium was refurbished. The stadium holds 30,000 people. It is one of Grulla Morioka's home grounds.

External links
Stadium information 

Football venues in Japan
Athletics (track and field) venues in Japan
Rugby union stadiums in Japan
Multi-purpose stadiums in Japan
Sports venues in Iwate Prefecture
Sport in Morioka
Sports venues completed in 1966
1966 establishments in Japan
Iwate Grulla Morioka
FC Ganju Iwate